Rocky Mountain Trophy Hunter: Interactive Big Game Hunting is a video game developed by Sunstorm and published by WizardWorks for Windows. An expansion pack, Alaskan Expedition, was released that added new weapons including crossbow and .30-06 rifle. It was later bundled with the main game under the title Rocky Mountain Trophy Hunter: Special Edition Two-Pack.

Gameplay
Rocky Mountain Trophy Hunter: Interactive Big Game Hunting features a selection of game animals that players can hunt including moose, elk, mountain goat, and bear.

Reception
Next Generation reviewed the Windows version of the game, rating it two stars out of five, and stated that "This is a great example of appealing to an underserved niche in the market, but a pretty mediocre game."

Reviews
Computer Gaming World Issue 170

References

1998 video games
Hunting video games
Single-player video games
Video games developed in the United States
Video games with expansion packs
Windows games
Windows-only games
WizardWorks games